Parliamentary elections were held in Iceland on 9 July 1927. Voters elected all 28 seats in the Lower House of the Althing and eight of the fourteen seats in Upper House. The Progressive Party emerged as the largest party in the Lower House, winning 13 of the 28 seats.

Results

Notes

References

Elections in Iceland
Iceland
Parliament
Iceland